Richard Warner may refer to:

Richard Warner (actor) (1911–1989), English actor
Richard Warner (botanist) (1711/3–1775), English scholar
Richard Warner (antiquary) (1763–1857), English clergyman and antiquarian
Richard Warner (Tennessee politician) (1835–1915), U.S. Representative from Tennessee
Richard Everett Warner (1861–?), American businessman and politician who served as the mayor of Taunton, Massachusetts
Richard Warner (musician), new-age musician and flautist
Richard Warner, American drummer and former member of the power metal band Kamelot
Dick Warner (1946–2017), Irish environmentalist, writer and broadcaster